DXEF (100.7 FM) was a radio station owned and operated by Bombo Radyo Philippines through its licensee People's Broadcasting Service, Inc. It was formerly known as 100.7 EF The Gentle Wind from 1988 to 1994 and Star FM from 1994 to 2010, when it went off the air.

References

Radio stations in General Santos
Radio stations established in 1988
Radio stations disestablished in 2010
Defunct radio stations in the Philippines